Duško Čurlić (born 28 January 1968) is a Croatian actor and radio host for Croatian radiotelevision.

Born in Zagreb, Čurlić is best known for hosting the Croatian TV shows Ples sa zvijezdama, Zvijezde pjevaju and Kruške i jabuke. His roles in film and television include Bitange i princeze, Ljubav u zaleđu, Ne pitaj kako! and Iza stakla. 

Čurlić began his career as a radio host on Radio 101, hosting some of the most popular radio shows: Parlament show and Intervju tjedna. 

He acts as a standard host of Dora—the Croatian pre-selection for Eurovision Song Contest—and commentator of the Eurovision Song Contest for Croatia.

TV appearances

Series roles 
 "Bitange i princeze" as prisoner/speaker (2005–2008)
 "Ljubav u zaleđu"

Movie roles 
 Iza stakla (2008)
 Ne pitaj kako! (2006)

Hostings 
 Do posljednjeg zbora (2012)
 Zvijezde pjevaju (2007–present)
 Ples sa zvijezdama (2006 –present)
 Dora (2006–2010; 2019.-present)
 Kruške i jabuke (1999–2002)
 Parliament show 
 Intervju tjedna

References

Croatian television presenters
1968 births
Living people
Television people from Zagreb
Eurovision commentators